Frank Farrelly (26 August 1931 – 10 February 2013) was a therapist best known for the 1974 book Provocative Therapy, which advocated radical (and sometimes humorous) therapeutic moves intended to jolt the client out of his current mindset.

Biography
Farrelly holds a master's degree in Social Work from The Catholic University Of America and is a member of the Academy of Certified Social Workers. For many years he was a clinical professor at the  University of Wisconsin School of Social Work and an assistant clinical professor in the Department of Psychiatry at the University of Wisconsin Medical School. As a social worker in the 1960s he developed his "provocative" theory, Provocative Therapy is a system of psychotherapy in which - having established a foundation of compassion, and with the client's permission - the therapist plays the devil's advocate. They will side with the negative half of the client's ambivalence toward his life's goals, his relationships, work, and the structures within which he lives. Client examples include working with obese patients with their weight and eating habits. His methods, though controversial, have attracted worldwide attention. In 2013 Frank Farrelly's son Tim Farrelly passed with Frank's instruction the Frank Farrelly archive to Nick Kemp who continues to promote Farrelly's classic Provocative Therapy as well as his own Provocative Change Works approach in the US, Asia and Europe.

References

External links
Frank Farrelly's Homepage for Provocative Therapy
 Robin Pape: Biography of Frank Farrelly in: Biographical Archive of Psychiatry (BIAPSY), 2015.
Provocative Change Works www.provocativechangeworks.com

1931 births
2013 deaths
21st-century American psychologists
Catholic University of America alumni
Human Potential Movement